Henry Young (1803–1870) was a Governor of South Australia and of Tasmania.

Henry Young may also refer to:

Henry Melvin Young, British World War II squadron leader
Henry Esson Young (1862–1939), physician and politician in British Columbia, Canada
Henry G. Young (1891-1956), American lawyer and politician
Henry Young (footballer) (1873–1923), Australian rules footballer for Geelong
Henry Young (major) (1841–1866), Union spy commander during the American Civil War
Henry Young (deputy governor), deputy governor of Bombay, 1668–1669

See also
Harry Young (disambiguation)
Henri Young (born 1911), Alcatraz prisoner
Henri Young, American child actor from the film Aliens in the Attic